Mountview Cemetery is a city-owned cemetery and was established in 1920 and was merged with Billings Cemetery in Billings, Montana, and is the largest cemetery in the region, with over 25,000 burials and interments.

Notable burials
 Henry Frith - First resident of Yellowstone County
 Jean McCormick - Claimed to be the daughter of Calamity Jane and Wild Bill Hickok
 Sara E. Morse - Executive Secretary of the Montana Tuberculosis Association

Notes

Cemeteries in Montana
Protected areas of Yellowstone County, Montana
Buildings and structures in Billings, Montana
Tourist attractions in Billings, Montana